Lyle Joseph Mouton (born May 13, 1969) is a former professional baseball player who played outfield in the Major Leagues from 1995 to 2001. He also played part of 1998 in Japan for the Yakult Swallows.

Mouton attended St. Thomas More School in Lafayette.

College
Lyle originally entered school at LSU on a basketball scholarship  and played as a guard. After two seasons, he focused solely on baseball, playing outfield for the LSU Tigers from 1989 to 1991. He led the Tigers to three straight College World Series tournaments, with the team winning the championship in 1991. He also led them to back-to-back SEC championships, 1990-91. He was on the 1990 All-Tournament College World Series team as a designated hitter, then again for the 1991 tournament as an outfielder. In 1990, he played collegiate summer baseball with the Brewster Whitecaps of the Cape Cod Baseball League and was named a league all-star.

References

External links

1969 births
Living people
Baltimore Orioles players
Milwaukee Brewers players
Chicago White Sox players
Florida Marlins players
American expatriate baseball players in Japan
Yakult Swallows players
Baseball players from Louisiana
LSU Tigers baseball players
LSU Tigers basketball players
Brewster Whitecaps players
Sportspeople from Lafayette, Louisiana
Oneonta Yankees players
Albany-Colonie Yankees players
Prince William Cannons players
Columbus Clippers players
Nashville Sounds players
Birmingham Barons players
Rochester Red Wings players
Louisville RiverBats players
Indianapolis Indians players
New Orleans Zephyrs players
Toledo Mud Hens players
Norfolk Tides players
Scranton/Wilkes-Barre Red Barons players
Buffalo Bisons (minor league) players